The Crna River ("Black River"), traditionally known in English as the Cerna, is a river in North Macedonia. It is the right tributary of the Vardar River. It runs through much of the south and west of the country. Its source is in the mountains on the western part of North Macedonia, northwest of Demir Hisar.

It enters the Pelagonia valley at the village of Buchin and then flows through the village Sopotnica, and southwards through the plains east of Bitola. At Brod (Novaci Municipality) it turns northeast. It leaves the Pelagonia valley at the Staravina village and goes in the biggest canyon in North Macedonia, the Skočivir valley and flows into the Vardar River between Rosoman and Gradsko.

Thus, the river makes a bend of almost 180 degrees east of Bitola. This bend was part of the Macedonian front in World War I. It was known to the allied forces as the Cerna Bend or Cerna Loop, and two major battles were fought here: the Battle of the Cerna Bend (1916) and the Battle of the Crna Bend (1917).

The name Crna Reka means "Black River" in Macedonian, a translation of its earlier Thracian name, Erigon, meaning "black", akin to Greek érebos, "darkness"; Armenian erek, "evening"; Old Norse røkkr, "darkness"; Gothic riqis, "darkness"; Sanskrit rájas, "night"; and Tocharian B orkamo, "dark".

The Erigon River is mentioned by Arrian in the Anabasis of Alexander, Livy in the History of Rome Strabo in the Geographica, Athenaeus in the Deipnosophistae.

References

Rivers of North Macedonia